Hiromi is a Japanese given name that can be given to males or females.

Name meanings
Hiromi can be written using different kanji characters and can mean:
寛美, "Generous beauty"
弘美, "Wide beauty"
博美, "Exposition beauty"
浩美, "Prosperous beauty"
宏美

People with the name
Notable people with the name include:

 Hiromi, also known as Hiromi Uehara (上原 ひろみ, born 1979), Japanese jazz composer and pianist
 Hiromi (comedian), (ヒロミ, born 1965), Japanese comedian and television personality
 Hiromi (model) (新畑 博美, born 1990), Japanese fashion model
 Hiromi Amada (天田 ヒロミ, born 1973), Japanese kickboxer
 Romi Dames born Hiromi Dames (born 1979), Japanese-American actress
 Hiromi Go (郷 ひろみ, born 1955), Japanese pop singer famous during the 1970s
 Hiromi Goto (born 1966), Japanese-Canadian novelist
, Japanese pianist
 Hiromi Hara (原 博実, born 1958), Japanese former football player
 Hiromi Hayakawa (1982-2017), Mexican singer
 Hiromi Hirata (平田 宏美, born 1978), Japanese voice actress and singer
 Hiromi Igarashi (五十嵐 裕美, born 1986), Japanese voice actress
 Hiromi Itō (伊藤 比呂美, born 1955), Japanese writer
 Hiromi Iwasaki (singer) (岩崎 宏美, born 1959), Japanese musician and singer
, Japanese cyclist
Hiromi Katsura (桂 宏美, born 1975), Japanese singer
, Japanese basketball player
 Hiromi Kawakami (川上 弘美, born 1958), Japanese writer
 Hiromi Kobayashi (golfer) (小林 浩美, born 1963), Japanese LPGA golfer
 Hiromi Konno (今野 宏美, born 1975), Japanese voice actress
 Hiromi Makihara (born 1963), Japanese baseball pitcher
 Hiromi Matsunaga (松永裕美, born 1984), Japanese professional ten-pin bowler
 Hiromi Matsuura (松浦ひろみ, born 1984), Japanese singer and AV idol
 Hiromi Miyake (三宅 宏実, born 1985), Japanese weightlifter
 Hiromi Nagasaku (永作 博美, born 1970), Japanese actress, pop singer and former member of the Jpop group Ribbon
, Japanese shogi player
, Japanese footballer
 Hiromi Oka, (岡裕己, born 1993), Japanese baseball player
 Hiromi Oshima (大島 浩美, born 1980), Japanese erotic model and former playmate
 Hiromi Ōta (太田 裕美, born 1955), Japanese musician, singer and former idol
 Hiromi Ōtsu (大津 広美, born 1984), Japanese speed skater
, Japanese speed skater
 Hiromi Seino-Suga (清野-菅 弘美, born 1973), Japanese biathlete
 Hiromi Shinya (新谷 弘実, born 1935), Japanese gastroenterologist
 Hiromi Suzuki (illustrator), Japanese illustrator
 Hiromi Suzuki (athlete) (鈴木 博美, born 1968), Japanese long-distance runner who competed in both the 1992, and the 1996 Summer Olympics
, Japanese speed skater
 Hiromi Taniguchi (谷口 浩美, born 1960), Japanese former long-distance runner
 Hiromi Tsuru (鶴 ひろみ, 1960–2017), Japanese voice actress
 Hiromi Wada ((和田 博実, 1937–2009), Japanese baseball player
 Hiromi Yamada (山田 宏巳, born 1953), Japanese chef
, Japanese speed skater
 Hiromi Yanagihara (柳原 尋美, 1979–1999), Japanese pop singer and founding member of Country Musume
, Japanese politician

Fictional characters
 Hiromi Tachibana, a character in Beyblade
 Hiromi Yamazaki, a character in Patlabor
 Hiromi Fujimori, a character in Angelic Layer
 Hiromi Sugita, a character in Boku Dake ga Inai Machi
 Hiromi Shiota, a character in Assassination Classroom
 Hiromi Yorozu, a character in Inazuma Eleven
 Hiromi Higa, a character in SK8 the Infinity
 Hiromi Higuruma, a character in Jujutsu Kaisen

References

Japanese unisex given names